Taenioides cirratus,the Bearded worm goby, is a species of worm goby native to the Indian Ocean and the western Pacific Ocean from islands offshore of eastern Africa to New Caledonia and from Japan to Australia. This species can be found in estuaries and coastal waters, preferring areas with mud substrates feeding on small crustaceans and other invertebrates. It is capable of surviving in air for a considerable period by sucking air into its bronchial chambers probably to move over land.

They are found in fresh, brackish, and salt water and the dispersion area is the Mae Klong River (Samut Songkram Province) and Thai Sea Boundary. In Thailand, this species is called  and is sometimes eaten.

References

cirratus
Fish described in 1860
Taxa named by Edward Blyth